Vonda Lisa Malone is the Chief executive officer of the Torres Strait Regional Authority starting her five-year term on 1 May 2022 and is on the NIAA Senior Advisory Group. Vonda was the first female Mayor of the Torres Shire Council.

Family
Vonda is the daughter of Mary Isabella (Bella) Moar and is of Peidu Tribe, Erub Island and grew up on Thursday Island in the Torres Strait region.

Career
An Australian Diplomat with the Department of Foreign Affairs and Trade and then with United Nations Office of the Human Rights Commission. Vonda is founding Chair of Torres Health Indigenous Corporation and was Chair of the Torres Cape Indigenous Council Alliance. and was a member of Indigenous Reference Group for the Developing Northern Australia Initiative. Chair of Community Enterprise Queensland/Islanders Industry Board of Service (IBIS) since 2012 and member of the Telstra Advisory Committee. Vonda was Executive Manager of the Torres Strait and Northern Peninsula Area Health Partnership. Vonda is also a 2001 Fellow of the United Nations Office of the Human Rights Commission Indigenous Fellowship Program, a member of the Oxfam Australia Straight Talk Steering Committee, representative on the TCHHS Clinical Safety and quality Committee, member of the Torres Strait Dementia Project and a member of the Australian Institute of Company Directors.

Awards
 Centenary Medal - For distinguished contribution to the Torres Strait Regional Authority.
 2017 McKinnon Emerging Political Leader of the Year
 NAIDOC Award of Excellence.

Education
 Fellow of Australian Rural Leadership Program
 Graduate Certificate in Public Sector Management
 Graduate Certificate in Australian Rural Leadership

References

Living people
21st-century Australian public servants
Year of birth missing (living people)